Fred Koch may refer to:

Fred C. Koch (1900–1967), American petroleum engineer and entrepreneur, founder of Koch Industries
Fred Conrad Koch (1876–1948), American biochemist and endocrinologist
Frederick R. Koch (1933-2020), American collector and philanthropist
Freddy Koch (1916–1980), Danish film actor
Fred Koch Brewery, a New York brewery established in 1888

See also
Koch Foods, American food processing and distributing company founded by a different Fred Koch
Koch (surname)